Flat Rock is a city mostly in Wayne County of the U.S. state of Michigan. A very small portion of the city extends into Monroe County. At the 2010 census, the city population was 9,878.

History
Flat Rock began as a Wyandot settlement. It was later designated as a reservation for the Wyandot, and still functioned as such in 1830.

The first European-American settlers in Flat Rock were Michael Vreeland and his five grown sons between 1811 and 1820. Michael had been captured by British Rangers during the Revolutionary War and released after American independence. The family purchased . The town was called the Village of Vreeland until 1838 when the Vreeland family sold off most of the land and relinquished control of the area. The Vreeland families built the first grain and lumber mill, having brought the grinding stones from New York. Descendants of Michael Vreeland still live in the town and attend Flat Rock public schools, being the seventh generation to reside in the town their family founded.

The first mention of any settlers in the area later to become Flat Rock was made by a French priest, Father Jean Dilhet. In describing his parish in 1798 he included "Grosse Roche", referring to a settlement named after the outcropping of limestone rock on the south side of the Huron River.

In 1818, a land office opened in Detroit, and Soloman Sibley purchased  of land. In 1824 it was sold to Michael and Jacob Vreeland. Vreelandt and Smooth Rock villages were platted on part of this acreage. At this time there were Huron, Seneca, and Wyandot Indian villages in the area.

With the Erie Canal opening in 1825, many people, especially from New York, came to Michigan to settle. By 1828 the village had four stores, two saw mills, a wool carding mill, a flour mill, and 250 inhabitants - serving as a center mainly for farmers who lived in the area immediately surrounding the settlement.

The village of Flat Rock was platted and recorded in 1838 by the Gibraltar and Flat Rock Land Co. They were attempting to build a canal to connect Lake Erie with Lake Michigan. This effort ultimately failed.

Henry Ford was attracted to the water power of the Huron River, and in 1925 he established the Ford Motor Company Lamp Factory along its banks.  The Flat Rock Dam was constructed to provide hydroelectricity to the factory.

The area was incorporated as a village in 1923 and as a city in 1965. While Flat Rock is a rapidly growing community today, even with its growth, it remains a unique "small town" with many of its residents having roots reaching back to the 1800s.

From the 1930s until the early 1960s an airport was located in Flat Rock. The grass airfield was known as Nan-Bar Airport, named for the owner's two daughters, Nancy and Barbara. During World War II Nan-Bar Airport served as an accessory airfield for Naval Air Station Grosse Ile. Navy pilots used the airfield for short field landing instruction, as well as for emergency landings.

In 2021, Ford Motor Company dumped benzene into the city sewer system causing 1,100 people to evacuate their homes.

Geography 
The city is primarily within Wayne County, but a portion of the city lies in Monroe County, because the border along the Huron River follows the course of the river in 1923, the year Flat Rock was incorporated as a village. At the time, the river had two meanders, but they have since been filled in.

Flat Rock has a higher overall tornado average than the state of Michigan as a whole, and a 40% greater average than the United States as a whole. Two F4 tornadoes have hit Flat Rock—one in 1956 and another in 1965 resulting in 23 deaths and over 300 injuries.

The city is listed by the U.S. Census Bureau as belonging to both Wayne County to the north and Monroe County to the south. However, the city is still listed in several categories as being part of Monroe County. The official Flat Rock city website also mentions the city's boundaries extending into Monroe County.

Economy
In December 2019 Flat Rock had an unemployment rate of 6.5%, higher than the US average of 3.7%. Per capita income in Flat Rock was $27,549, below the US average of $31,177. The average household income was $63,375, above the US average of $57,652. The family median income was $76,481, above the US average of $70,850.

Demographics

2010 census
As of the census of 2010, there were 9,878 people, 3,754 households, and 2,684 families living in the city. The racial makeup of the city was 91.1% White, 4.1% African American, 0.5% Native American, 0.8% Asian, 0.6% from other races, and 2.9% from two or more races. Hispanic or Latino of any race were 4.4% of the population.

There were 3,754 households, of which 38.9% had children under the age of 18 living with them, 49.8% were married couples living together, 16.6% had a female householder with no husband present, 5.1% had a male householder with no wife present, and 28.5% were non-families. 23.6% of all households were made up of individuals, and 8.1% had someone living alone who was 65 years of age or older. The average household size was 2.62 and the average family size was 3.10.

The median age in the city was 36.9 years. 27.4% of residents were under 18; 8.4% were between the ages of 18 and 24; 26.6% were from 25 to 44; 27.1% were from 45 to 64; and 10.4% were 65 years of age or older. The gender makeup of the city was 48.1% male and 51.9% female.

2000 census
As of the census of 2000, there were 8,488 people, 3,181 households, and 2,306 families living in the city. The racial makeup of the city was 95.32% White, 1.43% African American, 0.49% Native American, 0.47% Asian, 0.64% from other races, and 1.65% from two or more races. Hispanic or Latino of any race were 2.70% of the population.

There were 3,181 households, out of which 39.8% had children under 18 living with them, 51.7% were married couples living together, 16.6% had a female householder with no husband present, and 27.5% were non-families. 22.9% of all households were made up of individuals, and 8.6% had someone living alone who was 65 years of age or older. The average household size was 2.66 and the average family size was 3.12.

The population was spread out in the city, with 29.3% under 18, 10.1% from 18 to 24, 30.3% from 25 to 44, 20.8% from 45 to 64, and 9.5% who were 65 years of age or older. The median age was 33 years. For every 100 females, there were 93.9 males. For every 100 females age 18 and over, there were 87.7 males.

The median income for a household in the city was $44,084, and the median income for a family was $54,186. Males had a median income of $43,967 versus $27,348 for females. The per capita income for the city was $21,256. About 8.5% of families and 8.8% of the population were below the poverty line, including 11.3% of those under age 18 and 4.8% of those age 65 or over.

Notable people
Dann Florek, actor
 Fred Gladding Major League Baseball pitcher

Education 
Flat Rock is served by Flat Rock Community Schools.

See also

References
Specific

General
 Fucini, Joseph J. (2008). Working for the Japanese. Simon & Schuster. .

External links 
 
 Flat Rock Downtown Development Authority
 Flat Rock Historical Society

1923 establishments in Michigan
Populated places established in 1923
Cities in Monroe County, Michigan
Cities in Wayne County, Michigan
Metro Detroit